Thorsten Svensson (October 8, 1901 – June 29, 1954) was a Swedish football player who competed in the 1924 Summer Olympics. He was a member of the Swedish team, which won the bronze medal in the football tournament.

References

External links
profile

1901 births
1954 deaths
Swedish footballers
Footballers at the 1924 Summer Olympics
Olympic footballers of Sweden
Olympic bronze medalists for Sweden
Sweden international footballers
Olympic medalists in football
Medalists at the 1924 Summer Olympics
Association football forwards
GAIS players